The Day Will Come may refer to:

Fiction
The Day Will Come (2009 film), a German-French drama film
 The Day Will Come (2016 film), a Danish film
 The Day Will Come, a 1944 play by Leo Birinski
 The Day Will Come, a 2007 novel by Judy Clemens

Music
 The Day Will Come (album) or the title song, by Howard Riley, 1970
 "The Day Will Come", a song by Mary Wells from The One Who Really Loves You, 1962
 "The Day Will Come", a song by Psy from Chiljip Psy-da, 2015
 "The Day Will Come", a song by Rod Stewart, 1965

See also
 A Day Will Come (1934 film), a German French-language film
 A Day Will Come (1950 film), a West German film
 The Day Shall Come, a 2019 American comedy film